Versum Materials, Inc. is an American company that manufactures chemical-mechanical planarization slurries, ultra-thin dielectric and metal  precursors of film, formulated cleans and etching products, and delivery equipment for the semiconductor industry. It is a subsidiary of Merck Group.

History
On October 3, 2016, Air Products & Chemicals completed the corporate spin-off of the company.

In 2017, the company acquired Dynaloy from Eastman Chemical Company  for approximately $13 million to expand its Surface Prep and Cleans business.

In October 2019, Merck Group acquired the company.

References

Merck Group
Companies based in Tempe, Arizona
Companies formerly listed on the New York Stock Exchange
Manufacturing companies based in Arizona
Chemical companies of the United States
American companies established in 2016
Chemical companies established in 2016
2019 mergers and acquisitions
2016 establishments in Arizona
Corporate spin-offs
American subsidiaries of foreign companies